Fougo is a village in the Bassar Prefecture in the Kara Region  of north-western Togo, near the border of Ghana.

References

Populated places in Kara Region
Bassar Prefecture